List of things named after Dutch physicist Hendrik Antoon Lorentz:

Mathematics and science
Abraham–Lorentz force
Abraham–Lorentz–Dirac Force
Cauchy–Lorentz distribution
Lorentzian
Drude–Lorentz  model
Fock–Lorentz symmetry
Lorentz–Berthelot rules
Lorentz covariance
Lorentz symmetry
Lorentz–FitzGerald contraction
Heaviside–Lorentz units
Lorentz–Lorenz equation
Lorentz aether theory
Lorentz factor
Lorentz force
Lorentz force velocimetry
Lorentz group
Lorentz manifold
Lorentz metric
Lorentz pendulum
Lorentz oscillator model
Lorentz scalar
Lorentz surface
Lorentz transformation
Lorentz-violating electrodynamics
Tauc–Lorentz model

Others
  Lorentz Centre
Lorentz (crater)
Lorentz Institute
Lorentz Medal
Lorentz locks, lock in the Afsluitdijk in the Netherlands
Lorentz Casimir Lyceum (nl)
Lorentz Driver (Exotic-tier Linear Fusion Rifle found in Destiny 2)
L
Hendrik Lorentz